Museu Etnográfico da Praia is an ethnographic museum in the Cape Verdean capital of Praia on the island of Santiago. It is located at 45 Rua 5 de Julho, in the historic part of the city, the Plateau. The museum was opened in November 1997 and is located in a 19th century building. The museum contains a selection of objects that represent the traditional uses and customs of the Cape Verdean people.

See also
 List of museums in Cape Verde
 Culture of Cape Verde
 Museu Municipal de São Filipe
 List of buildings and structures in Santiago, Cape Verde

Notes

Further reading
 Ana Samira Silva, Museu Etnográfico da Praia: catálogo da exposição, Instituto da Investigação e do Património Culturais (IIPC), Ministério da Cultura, Praia, 2007, 34 pages

External links

 Museu Etnográfico da Praia 
 Collections at Capeia Arraiana site via Wordpress 
 Building history at the National Cultural Institute website 
 Interview with a museum official, a video, RTP África 

Buildings and structures in Praia
Plateau of Praia
Museums in Cape Verde
Museums established in 1997
1997 establishments in Cape Verde
Portuguese colonial architecture in Cape Verde